Rudolf Gottfried Kallas (22 May 1851 – 22 April 1913) was an Estonian clergyman and pedagog.

1871-1875 he was a primary school pedagog in Tartu. In 1883 he graduated from Tartu University. After graduating he had been a pastor in Valga, Rõuge and St. Petersburg.

Until 1881 he was a member of Estonian Literary Society.

His "System der Gedächtnislehre" was the first scientific publication about psychology which was written by an Estonian.

Works
 Mõistlik rehkendaja: Kõigile rehkendamise sõpradele, iseäranis koolmeistritele ning koolidele tuluks ning toeks, 1874
 Ülesannete kogu, 1875
 Mõistliku rehkendaja tarwilisemad õpetused: Kuidas? Miks? ja Millal?, 1878
 Otto Wilhelm Masing (Tähtsad mehed. Toim. M. J. Eisen), 1883
 Die Methodik des elementaren Rechenunterrichts, prinzipiell-systematisch abgeleitet, 1889
 Igawene Ewangelium ehk Rõõmusõnum Jeesusest: Uus jutlus-raamat, 1889
 Meie Issanda Jeesuse Kristuse Armulaud: Seitse raamatut pühast altarisakramendist ning lepitaja ohvrisurmast, 1891
 Saaroni Valge Lill Pulmapäevaks: Perekonna-raamat, 1894
 System der Gedächtnislehre: Ein Beitrag zur Pädagogik, 1897
 Õlipuulehed ehk 31 rahusõna Jeesuse suust wäsinutele: Kuupäewade palweraamat ja pühalikud mõtlemised perekonnale ja üksikule, 1897
 Kunas on meie Issand Jeesus Kristus sündinud?, 1898
 Millal on meie Issand Jeesus ristilöödud?, 1899
 Suur-Reede ehk Paastukannel, 1901

References

1851 births
1913 deaths
People from Saaremaa Parish
People from Kreis Ösel
Estonian Lutheran clergy